Elbert T. Gill, Jr. (August 23, 1931 – March 29, 2014) was an American chiropractor and politician.

From Memphis, Tennessee, Gill went to the William R. Moore School of Technology and the Palmer College of Chiropractic. He was a chiropractor. He served in the Tennessee House of Representatives from 1966 to 1986 as a Democrat. In 1987, Gill was appointed Tennessee Commissioner of Conservation and served until 1991.

Notes

1931 births
2014 deaths
American chiropractors
People from Memphis, Tennessee
Palmer College of Chiropractic alumni
Democratic Party members of the Tennessee House of Representatives